The 1989 ABN World Tennis Tournament was a men's tennis tournament played on indoor carpet courts at Rotterdam Ahoy in the Netherlands. It was part of the Super Series of the 1989 Nabisco Grand Prix. It was the 17th edition of the tournament and was held from 6 February through 12 February 1989. Second-seeded Jakob Hlasek won the singles title.

Finals

Singles

 Jakob Hlasek defeated  Anders Järryd 6–1, 7–5
 It was Hlasek's 1st title of the year and the 7th of his career.

Doubles

 Miloslav Mečíř /  Milan Šrejber defeated  Jan Gunnarsson /  Magnus Gustafsson 7–6, 6–0
 It was Mečíř's 1st title of the year and the 19th of his career. It was Šrejber's only title of the year and the 3rd of his career.

References

External links
 Official website 
 Official website 
 ATP tournament profile
 ITF tournament edition details

 
ABN World Tennis Tournament
ABN World Tennis Tournament
ABN World Tennis Tournament